The men's ne-waza 94 kg competition in ju-jitsu at the 2017 World Games took place on 28 July 2017 at the GEM Sports Complex in Wrocław, Poland.

Results

Elimination round

Group A

Group B

Finals
{{#invoke:RoundN|N4
|widescore=yes|bold_winner=high|team-width=260
|RD1=Semifinals
|3rdplace=yes

||{{flagIOC2athlete|Kristóf Szűcs|HUN|2017 World Games}}|7||0
|||2|{{flagIOC2athlete|Faisal Al-Ketbi|UAE|2017 World Games}}|2

|||0|{{flagIOC2athlete|Faisal Al-Ketbi|UAE|2017 World Games}}|2

||

References

Ju-jitsu at the 2017 World Games